Aphanotrigonum is a genus of frit flies in the family Chloropidae. There are at least 2 described species in Aphanotrigonum.

Species
 Aphanotrigonum darlingtoniae (Jones, 1916)
 Aphanotrigonum scabrum (Aldrich, 1918)

References

Further reading

External links

 Diptera.info

Oscinellinae
Taxa named by Oswald Duda